Scopula aspiciens is a moth of the family Geometridae. It was described by Prout in 1926. It is endemic to Madagascar.

References

Moths described in 1926
aspiciens
Moths of Madagascar
Moths of Africa